Ben Saxton (born November 21, 1988 in Calgary, Alberta) is a Canadian beach volleyball player. Saxton has qualified to compete (along with partner Chaim Schalk) at the 2016 Summer Olympics.

Career
Saxton played volleyball and beach volleyball as a youth in his home town at the Canuck Stuff Volleyball Club. Together with Will Pasieka they became the 2004 Canadian U16 champions. In both 2004 and 2005 they were the Canadian U18 runners-up, but returned as the U20 Canadian champions in 2006
and also participated in the U19 World Championships. In 2007, Saxton played with Mark Ellingson in international tournaments. After Saxton had played two smaller tournaments with Martin Reader in 2008, he started with Jessi Lelliott, and in 2010 with Steve Marshall on the FIVB World Tour, but with little success. Even with Christian Redmann there were no top-ten places on the FIVB World Tour, but Redmann / Saxton won the silver medal at the NORCECA Championship 2011 in Mexico. Since 2013 Saxton played successfully alongside Chaim Schalk. At the World Cup in Stare Jabłonki Saxton / Schalk made it to the quarterfinals. Here they were defeated by the Brazilians Alison / Emanuel and took fifth place.

References

External links
 
 
 
 
 

Living people
1988 births
Canadian men's beach volleyball players
Sportspeople from Calgary
Beach volleyball players at the 2016 Summer Olympics
Olympic beach volleyball players of Canada